Mirela Pop (born 14 January 1986), née Ganea, better known as Mirela Ganea and sometimes as Mia Ganea, is a Romanian footballer who plays as a goalkeeper Liga I club ACS Heniu Prundu Bârgăului and the Romania women's national team.

Club career
In February 2020, Ganea signed with ACS Heniu Prundu Bârgăului.

Personal life
Ganea is married and has a son with her husband.

References

1986 births
Living people
Women's association football goalkeepers
Romanian women's footballers
Romania women's international footballers
Apollon Ladies F.C. players
Romanian expatriate footballers
Romanian expatriate sportspeople in Cyprus
Expatriate women's footballers in Cyprus
FCU Olimpia Cluj players
CFF Clujana players